Cabasse may mean:
 Cabasse (company), a manufacturer of high end loudspeakers, based in western France
 Cabasse, Var, a commune of the Var département in southeastern France